The N40 road (commonly known as the Cork South Ring Road, or locally 'The South Ring') is a national primary road in Cork City, Ireland. The road runs through Cork City forming a distributor route through the south side of the city, linking the N22 at Ballincollig in the west to the N25 at the Dunkettle Interchange in the east.  The present N40 was created on 23 February 2012 via statutory instrument.  The newly designated N40 was formed from parts of both the N22 and N25.  It is intended that once the Cork North Ring Road is completed, that the N40 will comprise a complete orbital route through the inner city.

Route

The Cork South Ring Road commences at the junction with the N22 at the end of the Ballincollig bypass. The N40 next passes the Curraheen Interchange before meeting the Bandon Road Roundabout, which forms a junction with the N71. This junction also gives access to west Bishopstown. The next exit leads from the Sarsfield Roundabout up to the Wilton Roundabout after passing Wilton Shopping Centre on the left, Cork University Hospital and west Bishopstown.
 
From there, after passing the exit to Togher/Turner's Cross, The South Ring Road runs east over the Kinsale Road Roundabout by flyover. It also meets the N27 to Cork International Airport, Kinsale Road and the N27 South Link Road to the city centre by exiting onto the Kinsale Road Roundabout by slip road.

The Cork South Ring Road continues east, overpassing Douglas and meets the N28 to Ringaskiddy (Carrigaline Road) at The Bloomfield Interchange. From here the road passes under the River Lee through the Jack Lynch Tunnel.

North of the tunnel, the South Ring Road ends at an interchange with the M8 to Dublin, the N8 to the city centre and the N25 to Waterford City via Midleton and Youghal.

Kinsale Road Roundabout upgrade 
On 4 August 2006, a  flyover of the Kinsale Road Roundabout was opened to traffic 6 months ahead of schedule. The project cost 55 million euro and consists of 3 lanes eastbound, 2 lanes west-bound and four on/off-ramps connecting the dual-carriageway to the roundabout.

Bandon Road Roundabout and Sarsfield Road Roundabout upgrade
On 12 March 2010, the NRA confirmed that both the Bandon Road Roundabout and the Sarsfield Road Roundabout would have flyovers built, with traffic travelling on the Cork South Ring Road being able to avoid both roundabouts when staying on the mainline.  While minor work on this scheme had already commenced in 2008, full construction started on 6 July 2011 and was completed in July 2013.  As well as two flyovers being built, the dual carriageway between both roundabouts will be upgraded and straightened with two access roads being built on either side for local access.

Cork North Ring Road
A Cork North Ring Road is in the planning phase with a number of different routes having been proposed.  The road will run from Glanmire to the junction of the N40 and the N22 in Ballincollig.  Upon completion, it is likely that this stretch of high quality dual carriage/motorway will be designated as part of the N40.  In addition, a stretch of motorway presently designated as the M8 may also be redesignated as the N40, meaning the N40 will completely encircle the inner city and city centre.

List of exits

See also
Roads in Ireland 
National primary road
Regional road
N22

References

40
Roads in County Cork